Toxorhina is a genus of crane fly in the family Limoniidae. It can be distinguished among other crane flies by the reduced number of veins in the wings, among other less apparent differences.

Species
Subgenus Ceratocheilus Wesche, 1910
T. alexanderi Tjeder, 1981
T. approximata Alexander, 1951
T. atritarsis Alexander, 1943
T. australasiae (Alexander, 1922)
T. biroi Alexander, 1934
T. bispinosa Alexander, 1965
T. bistyla Alexander, 1967
T. brachymera Alexander, 1956
T. brevifrons (Brunetti, 1918)
T. brevisector Alexander, 1974
T. caledonica Alexander, 1948
T. capnitis Alexander, 1956
T. chiapasensis Alexander, 1938
T. claripennis Alexander, 1958
T. cocottensis Alexander, 1956
T. contractifrons (Edwards, 1933)
T. cornigera (Speiser, 1908)
T. danieleae Alexander, 1979
T. drysdalei Alexander, 1937
T. edwardsi (Alexander, 1920)
T. flavicostata Alexander, 1954
T. flavirostris (Alexander, 1920)
T. formosensis (Alexander, 1928)
T. fulvicolor Alexander, 1967
T. fumipennis Alexander, 1936
T. fuscolimbata Alexander, 1967
T. gilesi (Edwards, 1911)
T. gressitti Alexander, 1962
T. growea Theischinger, 1994
T. hoogstraali Alexander, 1948
T. imperatrix Alexander, 1948
T. infuscula Alexander, 1962
T. inobsepta Alexander, 1978
T. juvenca Alexander, 1948
T. kokodae Alexander, 1951
T. latifrons (Brunetti, 1918)
T. leucomelanopus (Enderlein, 1912)
T. leucostena Alexander, 1937
T. levis (Hutton, 1900)
T. luteibasis Alexander, 1962
T. lyrata Alexander, 1972
T. maculipennis Alexander, 1936
T. majus (Edwards, 1926)
T. melanomera Alexander, 1962
T. mesorhyncha Alexander, 1936
T. monostyla Alexander, 1962
T. nasus Theischinger, 1994
T. nigripleura (Alexander, 1920)
T. nigropolita Alexander, 1956
T. nimbipleura Alexander, 1963
T. niveitarsis (Alexander, 1922)
T. nympha Alexander, 1961
T. ochracea (Edwards, 1923)
T. phaeoneura Alexander, 1960
T. pictipennis Alexander, 1972
T. pollex Alexander, 1956
T. prolongata Alexander, 1938
T. revulsa Alexander, 1955
T. romblonensis Alexander, 1929
T. scimitar Alexander, 1956
T. seychellarum (Edwards, 1912)
T. simplicistyla Alexander, 1967
T. streptotrichia Alexander, 1962
T. superstes Alexander, 1942
T. taiwanicola (Alexander, 1923)
T. tasmaniensis (Alexander, 1926)
T. tenebrica Alexander, 1961
T. tinctipennis (Alexander, 1930)
T. toxopeana Alexander, 1961
T. trichopyga Alexander, 1962
T. tuberifera Alexander, 1966
T. vulsa Alexander, 1952
T. westralis Theischinger, 1994
T. yamma Theischinger, 2000
Subgenus Eutoxorhina Alexander, 1934
T. ammoula Theischinger, 1994
T. parasimplex Hynes, 1988
T. simplex Alexander, 1934
Subgenus Toxorhina Loew, 1850
T. acanthobasis Alexander, 1960
T. angustilinea Alexander, 1930
T. atripes Alexander, 1922
T. basalis Alexander, 1951
T. basiseta Alexander, 1978
T. biceps Alexander, 1931
T. brevirama Alexander, 1953
T. brevistyla Alexander, 1965
T. brunniventris Edwards, 1931
T. carunculata Alexander, 1970
T. centralis (Alexander, 1913)
T. cisatlantica Speiser, 1908
T. curtipennis Alexander, 1975
T. curvata Alexander, 1938
T. cuthbertsoni Alexander, 1937
T. dendroidea Alexander, 1931
T. digitifera Alexander, 1964
T. distalis Alexander, 1936
T. domingensis Alexander, 1937
T. duyagi Alexander, 1930
T. fasciata Edwards, 1926
T. flavida (Alexander, 1913)
T. fragilis Loew, 1851
T. grahami (Wesche, 1910)
T. grossa Alexander, 1956
T. incerta Brunetti, 1912
T. infumata Edwards, 1928
T. infumipennis Alexander, 1942
T. jamaicensis Alexander, 1964
T. latamera Alexander, 1968
T. longicollis Pierre, 1924
T. magna Osten Sacken, 1865
T. mashona Alexander, 1959
T. megatricha Alexander, 1961
T. mendosa Alexander, 1935
T. meridionalis (Alexander, 1913)
T. montina Alexander, 1931
T. muliebris Osten Sacken, 1865
T. nigrivena Alexander, 1939
T. noeliana Alexander, 1956
T. occlusa Edwards, 1928
T. ochreata Edwards, 1931
T. pergracilis Alexander, 1944
T. perproducta Alexander, 1956
T. phoracaena Alexander, 1966
T. polycantha Alexander, 1940
T. polytricha Alexander, 1970
T. producta Edwards, 1928
T. protrusa Alexander, 1962
T. pulvinaria Alexander, 1950
T. scapania Alexander, 1966
T. scita Alexander, 1962
T. serpens Alexander, 1951
T. sparsiseta Alexander, 1962
T. staplesi Alexander, 1973
T. stenomera Alexander, 1972
T. stenophallus Alexander, 1937
T. subfragilis Alexander, 1970
T. suttoni Alexander, 1936
T. taeniomera Alexander, 1950
T. tonkouiana Alexander, 1958
T. trichorhyncha Edwards, 1926
T. trilineata Alexander, 1936
T. trilobata Alexander, 1938
T. tuberculata Alexander, 1931
T. violaceipennis Alexander, 1937
T. westwoodi Brunetti, 1920

References

Limoniidae